is a JR West Geibi Line station located in 5-chōme, Yaga, Higashi-ku, Hiroshima, Hiroshima Prefecture, Japan.

History
1929-03-20: Yaga Station opens
1937-07-01: Switching equipment at Yaga station is expanded
August 1941: Yaga Station closed due to World War II
1942-10-28: Signal cabin installed at Yaga Station
1943-04-02: Station status reinstated, and Yaga Station reopens
1987-04-01: Japanese National Railways is privatized, and Yaga Station becomes a JR West station

Station building and platforms
Yaga Station features one island platform capable of handling two lines simultaneously. Trains bound for Shiwaguchi and Miyoshi are handled on the upper end (上り) of the platform, and trains bound for Hiroshima are handled on the lower end (下り). The station features a Green Window.

Environs

Kirin Beer Park Hiroshima
Kirin Hiroshima Brewery
Diamond City Soleil (ダイヤモンドシティ・ソレイユ)
Hiroshima Wald 11 (movie theaters)
Takamagahara Memorial Gardens
Hiroshima Municipal Fuchū Elementary School
Hiroshima Municipal Nakayama Elementary School
Hiroshima Municipal Yaga Elementary School
JR West Hakata Railyard, Hiroshima Branch 
JR Freight Railyard

Highway access
 Japan National Route 54
 Hiroshima Expressway Route 1 (Aki-Fuchū Route)
 Hiroshima Prefectural Route 37 (Hiroshima-Miyoshi Route)
 Hiroshima Prefectural Route 70 (Hiroshima-Nakashima Route)
 Hiroshima Prefectural Route 84 (Higashi Kaita Hiroshima Route)
 Hiroshima Prefectural Route 151 (Fuchū-Kaita Route)
 Hiroshima Prefectural Route 152 (Fuchū-Gion Route)
 Hiroshima Prefectural Route 264 (Nakayama-Onaga Route)
 Hiroshima Prefectural Route 272 (Kamimiyachō-Shinchi Route)

Connecting lines
All lines are JR West lines. 
Geibi Line
Miyoshi Express (#1, 2, 5, 6, 7, 8)
No stop
Miyoshi Express (#3, 4)
Akiyaguchi Station — Yaga Station — Hiroshima Station
Commuter Liner
No stop
Miyoshi Liner/Local
Hesaka Station — Yaga Station — Hiroshima Station

External links
 JR West

Geibi Line
Hiroshima City Network
Stations of West Japan Railway Company in Hiroshima city
Railway stations in Japan opened in 1929
Railway stations closed in 1941
Railway stations in Japan opened in 1943